Reita Ethel Clanton (born July 30, 1952) is an American former handball player who competed in the 1984 Summer Olympics. She was born in Lafayette, Alabama.

References

External links
 Profile at Alabama Sports Hall of Fame

1952 births
Living people
People from LaFayette, Alabama
American female handball players
Olympic handball players of the United States
Handball players at the 1984 Summer Olympics
21st-century American women
Auburn Tigers women's basketball players
Auburn University personnel
Handball coaches of international teams